Beaver Lake Shelburne  is a lake of Municipality of the District of Barrington, in Nova Scotia, Canada.

See also
List of lakes in Nova Scotia

References
 National Resources Canada

Lakes of Nova Scotia